Estrone tetraacetylglucoside (brand name Glucovex, Glycovex) is a semisynthetic, steroidal estrogen. It is an estrogen ester, specifically, an ester of estrone. The drug was marketed since at least 1942.

References

Estrogens
Estrone esters